Tom "Tommy" Thomas (birth unknown) was a Welsh professional rugby league footballer who played in the 1900s.

Background
Tom Thomas was born in Aberavon, Wales.

Club career

Tom Thomas made his début for Wigan in the 26-11 victory over the Rochdale Hornets at Central Park, Wigan on Tuesday 25 December 1906, he scored his first try for Wigan (two tries) in the 37-3 victory over Liverpool City at Central Park, Wigan on Wednesday 2 January 1907, he scored his last try for Wigan in the 6-13 defeat by Barrow at Cavendish Park, Barrow-in-Furness on Saturday 1 February 1908, and he played his last match for Wigan in the 11-5 victory over Warrington at Central Park, Wigan on Saturday 15 February 1908. Tom Thomas transferred from Wigan to Merthyr Tydfil during the 1908–09 season for £60 (based on increases in average earnings, this would be approximately £21,100 in 2013), an amount that the Merthyr Tydfil's treasurer claimed he paid himself.

Notable tour matches
Tom Thomas played left-, i.e. number 4, in Wigan's 12-8 victory over New Zealand at Central Park, Wigan on Saturday 9 November 1907.

References

External links
Search for "Thomas" at rugbyleagueproject.org

Merthyr Tydfil RLFC players
Place of death missing
Rugby league centres
Rugby league players from Aberavon
Welsh rugby league players
Wigan Warriors players
Year of birth missing
Year of death missing